Tarafpur Union is a union of Mirzapur Upazila, Tangail District, Bangladesh. It is situated  21 km north of Mirzapur and 52 km southeast of Tangail, The district headquarter.

Demographics
According to Population Census 2011 performed by Bangladesh Bureau of Statistics, The total population of Tarafpur union is 23169. There are 5168 households in total.

Education
The literacy rate of Tarafpur Union is 47.3% (Male-50.6%, Female-44.4%).

See also
 Union Councils of Tangail District

References

Populated places in Dhaka Division
Populated places in Tangail District
Unions of Mirzapur Upazila